Washington's Headquarters at Valley Forge, also known as the Isaac Potts House, is a historic house that served as General George Washington's headquarters at Valley Forge during the American Revolutionary War. The building, which still stands, is one of the centerpieces of Valley Forge National Historical Park in Southeastern Pennsylvania. 

The house was built about 1773, and Washington made it his headquarters during the Continental Army encampment between December 1777 and June 1778. The restored building is part of the Valley Forge National Historical Park and is open to the public. It was designated a National Historic Landmark in 1972.

The house is located in Upper Merion Township.

Description and history
Washington's Valley Forge Headquarters stands between Pennsylvania Route 23 and the Schuylkill River near the center of Valley Forge National Historical Park. It is a three-story stone structure with a full cellar, three bays wide, with a side gable roof. A single-story ell extends to the left. The main entrance is in the left-most bay, sheltered by a gabled hood. There is a secondary entrance on the right end wall. The gable ends have pent roofs below, and circular windows in the gable center. The interior is decorated with period 18th-century furnishings and artifacts related to George Washington.

The house was built 1768–70 by Isaac Potts, a Quaker who operated a grist mill nearby. George Washington, and later his wife Martha as well, occupied this house from Christmas Eve 1777 until June 18, 1778. Washington conducted the army's business in an office on the ground floor during that period. The house became part of a state park in 1893, which was given to the people of the United States by Pennsylvania in 1976.

The Centennial and Memorial Association of Valley Forge, led by Founding Regent Anna Morris Holstein, was incorporated in 1878 with the purpose of saving, acquiring, preserving General Washington's Headquarters and immediate surrounding acreage. A large Centennial event to create awareness and raise funds was held on June 19, 1878, the 100th anniversary of Washington's Army exiting Valley Forge.

See also 
 Valley Forge – for the historical encampment and its impacts on the American Revolutionary War
 Valley Forge National Historical Park – for the current status of the Headquarters and encampment
 Valley Forge, Pennsylvania – for the location of this house.
List of Washington's Headquarters during the Revolutionary War
 List of National Historic Landmarks in Pennsylvania
 National Register of Historic Places listings in Montgomery County, Pennsylvania

References

Military history of the United States
Valley Forge
National Historic Landmarks in Pennsylvania
Houses on the National Register of Historic Places in Pennsylvania
Houses completed in 1773
Historic house museums in Pennsylvania
Museums in Montgomery County, Pennsylvania
American Revolutionary War museums in Pennsylvania
Houses in Montgomery County, Pennsylvania
Valley Forge National Historical Park
National Register of Historic Places in Montgomery County, Pennsylvania
American Revolution on the National Register of Historic Places
Upper Merion Township, Montgomery County, Pennsylvania
Historic district contributing properties in Pennsylvania